Saleh Muhammad Safoori Miana was a Sufi poet from southern Punjab. Saleh was the only son of Safoora Qadiriyya, a local saint.

He compiled the poetic collection Kulliyat-e-Saleh Muhammad Safoori. The book gives an introduction to Mai Safoora, Saleh Muhammad Safoori and Ali Haider. The collection contains the tales of Sassi Punnun, Sohni Mahiwal, two si-harfis, two poetic tribute to Sufi Sultan Abdul Hakeem and Jati Abdal and one in memory of his mother Mai Safoora. Other chapters present the history of the area and the style of the life of the people and the close relationship between the different religious communities settled in Sidhnai belt of River Ravi.

See also 
Mausoleum of Hazrat Mai Safoora Qadiriyya
Yousaf Tahir

References 

Safoori, Saleh
Sufi poets
1747 births
1826 deaths
Punjabi Sufis